The Lagos Central Senatorial District in Lagos State, Nigeria covers the local government areas of Apapa, Eti-Osa, Lagos Island, Lagos Mainland, and Surulere. The senator currently representing the district is Oluremi Tinubu of the All Progressives Congress, who was first elected in 2011.

List of Senators

References 

Politics of Lagos State
Senatorial districts in Nigeria
Members of the Senate (Nigeria)